The 2013 UEFA European Under-19 Championship elite round is the second round of qualification for the 2013 UEFA European Under-19 Championship final tournament.
The 25 teams that advanced from the first qualification round, plus three teams that received byes to the elite round, were distributed into seven groups of four teams, with one of the teams hosting all six group matches in a round-robin format. The seven group-winning teams will qualify automatically for the final tournament.

Seeds
A total of 28 participating teams were divided in four draw pots based on the coefficient ranking list established by taking into account only the results of the qualifying round. Spain, Serbia and Turkey received byes to the elite round and were seeded in the first pot. The draw was held on 5 December 2012 in Nyon.

{| class="wikitable"
|-
! width=170|Pot A
! width=170|Pot B
! width=170|Pot C
! width=180|Pot D
|-
|
|
|
|

Tiebreakers
If two or more teams are equal on points on completion of the group matches, the following criteria are applied to determine the rankings.
 Higher number of points obtained in the group matches played among the teams in question
 Superior goal difference from the group matches played among the teams in question
 Higher number of goals scored in the group matches played among the teams in question
 If, after applying criteria 1) to 3) to several teams, two teams still have an equal ranking, the criteria 1) to 3) will be reapplied to determine the ranking of these teams. If this procedure does not lead to a decision, criteria 5) and 6) will apply
 Results of all group matches:
 Superior goal difference
 Higher number of goals scored
 Drawing of lots
Additionally, if two teams which have the same number of points and the same number of goals scored and conceded play their last group match against each other and are still equal at the end of that match, their final rankings are determined by the penalty shoot-out and not by the criteria listed above. This procedure is applicable only if a ranking of the teams is required to determine the group winner.

Group 1

Group 2

Group 3

Group 4

Group 5

Group 6

Group 7

Qualified teams

1 Only counted appearances for under-19 era (bold indicates champion for that year, while italic indicates hosts)

References

External links
UEFA.com

2013 UEFA European Under-19 Championship
UEFA European Under-19 Championship qualification